Danny Jair Quendambú Cortés (born 19 March 1983) is a footballer who plays as a forward. His most recent club was Cultural Santa Rosa in the Peruvian Segunda División.

Born in Tumaco, Quendambú began playing football with the youth sides of Deportivo Cali. He would play professionally for several teams in Colombia, Costa Rica, Peru and Venezuela, including Deportivo Cali, Herediano, Carabobo, Cortuluá and Inti Gas. He joined Inti Gas in January 2011.

International career
While he was playing for Deportivo Cali, Quendambú participated in the Colombia national under-20 football team under manager Reinaldo Rueda.

Although Quendambú had no real ties with Equatorial Guinea, despite being an Afro-Colombian with a surname of African style, anyway he was called up for that country's national team. His first call was received in October 2011, when he still had not even ever walked in his "new" country, for two friendly matches against Gabon and Cameroon, but didn't play. Quendambú participated after this of the Equatoguinean pre-call for the 2012 African Cup of Nations, but he was left out for the final squad. He made his debut on 2 June 2012 versus Tunisia for a 2014 FIFA World Cup qualifying match.

References

1983 births
Living people
Association football forwards
People from Tumaco
Equatoguinean footballers
Equatorial Guinea international footballers
Colombian footballers
Equatoguinean people of Colombian descent
Categoría Primera A players
Deportivo Cali footballers
Deportivo Pereira footballers
Deportivo Pasto footballers
Unión Magdalena footballers
Cortuluá footballers
Liga FPD players
C.S. Herediano footballers
A.D. San Carlos footballers
C.F. Universidad de Costa Rica footballers
Venezuelan Primera División players
Carabobo F.C. players
Peruvian Segunda División players
Colombian expatriate footballers
Colombian expatriate sportspeople in Costa Rica
Expatriate footballers in Costa Rica
Colombian expatriate sportspeople in Venezuela
Expatriate footballers in Venezuela
Expatriate footballers in Equatorial Guinea
Colombian expatriate sportspeople in Peru
Expatriate footballers in Peru
Naturalized citizens of Equatorial Guinea
The Panthers F.C. players
Leones Vegetarianos FC players
Sportspeople from Nariño Department